Trust in Me is the third album led by saxophonist Houston Person which was recorded in 1967 and released on the Prestige label.

Reception

Allmusic awarded the album 3 stars, stating: "Houston Person is generally considered a soul-jazz specialist whose tenor playing can be counted on to elevate a standard organ combo or groove-based session into something memorable. This set, however, demonstrates Person's reach well beyond funk and blues grooves."

Track listing 
 "One Mint Julep" (Rudy Toombs) - 5:27  
 "Trust in Me" (Milton Ager, Arthur Schwartz, Ned Wever) - 4:57  
 "Hey There" (Richard Adler, Jerry Ross) - 5:11  
 "My Little Suede Shoes" (Charlie Parker) - 4:24  
 "That Old Black Magic" (Harold Arlen, Johnny Mercer) - 6:09  
 "Sometimes I Feel Like a Motherless Child" (Traditional) - 6:31  
 "The Second Time Around" (Sammy Cahn, Jimmy Van Heusen) - 5:49

Personnel 
Houston Person - tenor saxophone
Cedar Walton - piano
Paul Chambers - bass
Lenny McBrowne - drums
Ralph Dorsey - congas

References 

Houston Person albums
1967 albums
Prestige Records albums
Albums produced by Don Schlitten